The South Korea national under-23 football team (recognized as Korea Republic by FIFA, and Republic of Korea by IOC) represents South Korea at football in the Olympic Games and Asian Games. It was founded when the Olympic football was changed to an under-23 competition. It also can be managed as under-21 or under-22 team if necessary.

History

London Generation (2012)

Recent results and fixtures

The following is a list of match results in the last 12 months, as well as any future matches that have been scheduled.

2022

All-time results

Coaching staff

Current personnel

Manager history

Players

Current U-24 squad
The following 25 players were called up for the friendly matches in March 2022.

Current U-22 squad
The following 25 players were called up for the 2023 Doha Cup in March 2023.

Recent call-ups
The following players have also been called up to a South Korea under-23 squad within the last 12 months.

 

INJ Withdrew due to injury.WD Player withdrew from the squad due to non-injury issue.A Call up to A team.

Overage players
Football at the Summer Olympics and the Asian Games have required that under-23 players enter the competitions, but they have allowed three overage players can be included in one squad. These three players are called the "Wild cards" in South Korea. According to South Korean laws, Olympic medalists and Asian Games gold medalists can be exempted from the military service, and so top-level players also compete for wild cards.

Summer Olympics

Asian Games

Records
Statistics below are from matches which the KFA consider as official including non-international matches (against clubs, regional teams, and other KFA teams).

Most appearances

Top goalscorers

Competitive record

Summer Olympics
Football at the Summer Olympics was a senior tournament until 1988.

AFC U-23 Asian Cup

Asian Games
Football at the Asian Games was a senior tournament until 1998.

Honours
Summer Olympics
  Bronze medalists: 2012

AFC U-23 Asian Cup
  Champions: 2020
  Runners-up: 2016
 Fourth place: 2013, 2018

Asian Games
  Gold medalists: 2014, 2018
  Bronze medalists: 2002, 2010
 Fourth place: 2006

Minor competitions
 Dunhill Cup: 1999
 Four Nations Tournament (Australia): 2000
 Four Nations Tournament (South Africa): 2003
 Qatar Tournament: 2005
 King's Cup: 2012, 2015

Awards
 AFC National Team of the Year: 2012

See also

Football in South Korea
Korea Football Association
South Korea national football team
South Korea national football B team
South Korea national under-20 football team
South Korea national under-17 football team
South Korea women's national football team

Notes

References

External links
Official website, KFA.or.kr 

 
Korea Republic
Youth football in South Korea
Football